is a passenger railway station located in Higashi-ku in the city of Okayama, Okayama Prefecture, Japan. It is operated by the West Japan Railway Company (JR West).

Lines

Station layout
The station consists of one side platform  located on an embankment. The station is unattended.

Adjacent stations

History
Ōdara Station was opened on 1 September 1962. With the privatization of Japanese National Railways (JNR) on 1 April 1987, the station came under the control of JR West.

Passenger statistics
In fiscal 2019, the station was used by an average of 1623 passengers daily

Surrounding area
Okayama Municipal Asahihigashi Junior High School
Okayama Municipal Kachi Elementary School
Ōdara Yosemiya ruins

See also
List of railway stations in Japan

References

External links

 JR West Station Official Site

Railway stations in Okayama
Akō Line
Railway stations in Japan opened in 1962